WASP-3 is a magnitude 10 yellow-white dwarf star located about 800 light-years away in the Lyra constellation. It appears to be variable; it "passed from a less active (log R'_hk=-4.95) to a more active (log R'_hk=-4.8) state between 2007 and 2010".

Planetary system
The extrasolar planet WASP-3b was detected by the SuperWASP project in 2007.
The William Herschel Telescope had confirmed it was a planet by 2008.

In 2010, researchers proposed a second planet orbiting WASP-3. But in 2012 this proposal was debunked.

See also
 SuperWASP
 WASP-4

References

External links
 

Lyra (constellation)
F-type subgiants
Planetary transit variables
Planetary systems with one confirmed planet
3
J18343163+3539415